Alireza Salimi may refer to:
 Alireza Salimi (footballer)
 Alireza Salimi (politician)